Vachellia nilotica subsp. nilotica (commonly known as Egyptian thorn, prickly acacia, scented thorn or scented-pod acacia) is a perennial tree native to Africa.  It has also been introduced to the Indian Ocean area and to the Middle East.

Uses

Fodder
The leaves contain 14–20% protein.

Food
The young seed pods and young foliage are edible.  The raw or dried seeds are eaten when food is scarce.

Medicine
The bark is used to treat cough by the African Zulu.

Tannin
The seed pods of V. nilotica subsp. nilotica have a tannin content of about 25–33.8%.  The pods without seeds have a tannin content of about 50%.

Wood
The sapwood produces 4500kcal/kg when burned as firewood.  The tree's heartwood has a density of about 0.80 g/cm3.

References

nilotica subsp. nilotica
Forages
Plant subspecies
Plants used in traditional African medicine
Zulu culture